Rev. P.T. Givergis Paniker  Karichal was a priest, educationalist and astrologer of Syro-Malankara Catholic Church. He is from the great Panicker family and 39th priest of the family. He was the vicar of St. George Malanakara Syrian Catholic Church and the headmaster of St Mary's U.P school, Karichal.

Early life 
Fr. Givergis was born on 9 February 1912 at Karichal,  as the youngest son to Thomas Panicker and Mariyama Thomas Panicker. He was educated at the M.D. Seminary of the Orthodox Jacobite Church of  Kerala and was ordained deacon on 3 June 1928 by the Metropolitan Geevarghese Dionysius of Vattasseril. He took Aleyamma as his wife in the year 1929 and was stirred by the Reunion Movement of Mar Ivanios who received him into the Catholic Church in 1931. Ordained to the priesthood on 19 May 1936 by the late Archbishop Geevarghese Mar Ivanios of Trivandrum. Fr. Givergis Paniker Karichal was the first married deacon to have been raised to the dignity of the priesthood in the Malankara Syrian Catholic Church.

Though never educated formally in a Catholic Seminary, Fr. Givergis grew up as a leading theologian of the Malankara Syrian Catholic Church. His unparalleled interest in the Antiochene Rite Liturgy led him to be a great scholar in the Syriac language. By studying the language of liturgical texts he was able to shed new light on the meaning of the oriental traditions of the Eucharistic Service. His learned article on 'The Holy Qurbono in the Syro-Malankara Church' which he contributed to The Eucharistic Liturgy in the Christian East edited by Dr. J. Madey of  West Gennany testifies to this. His notes and diaries which he kept on the Malankara Rite Liturgy were posthumously published in two volumes by his son Fr. P.G. Thomas Paniker. His writings and especially his lectures which he gave to the students of the Pontifical Seminary, Alway, when he was a professor there, were noted for originality and depth which derive from his own prayer and reflection upon the mysteries of the liturgy.

A resident priest of the village of  Karichal in the District of Alleppey in Kerala, Fr. Givergis lived with his wife and children serving his folk faithfully till he died on 23 October 1986. He was a rare example of  holy and dedicated priestly life. His priesthood golden jubilee was celebrated on 19 May 1986, on the same year he was called to eternal life.

Books 
Givergis Paniker main work is THE HOLY QURBONO - IN THE SYRO MALANKARA CHURCH.

References

External links
 Malankara Library
 Mavelikara Diocese

1912 births
1986 deaths
Syro-Malankara Catholics
People from Alappuzha district